Mohammed Awaed (sometimes Muhamad Awad or Mohammad Awwad, ; born 9 June 1997) is an Israeli professional footballer who plays as a forward for Israeli Premier League club Bnei Sakhnin.

Early life
Awaed was born in Tamra, Israel, to a Muslim-Arab family.

Club career
Awaed made his Israeli Premier League debut for Maccabi Haifa on 10 September 2016 in a game against Bnei Yehuda.

Honours

Club 
Maccabi Haifa
 Israeli Premier League (1): 2020–21
 Israel Super Cup (1): 2021

References

External links
 

1997 births
Living people
Israeli Muslims
People from Tamra
Footballers from Northern District (Israel)
Arab-Israeli footballers
Arab citizens of Israel
Israeli footballers
Maccabi Haifa F.C. players
Lech Poznań players
Maccabi Petah Tikva F.C. players
Bnei Sakhnin F.C. players
Israeli Premier League players
Ekstraklasa players
Israeli expatriate footballers
Expatriate footballers in Poland
Israeli expatriate sportspeople in Poland
Association football forwards
Israel under-21 international footballers
Israel youth international footballers